Kiril Slavov (born 21 July 1945) is a Bulgarian volleyball player. He competed at the 1968 Summer Olympics and the 1972 Summer Olympics.

References

1945 births
Living people
Bulgarian men's volleyball players
Olympic volleyball players of Bulgaria
Volleyball players at the 1968 Summer Olympics
Volleyball players at the 1972 Summer Olympics
People from Pernik